Georges Meyer-Darcis, full name Georg Gottlieb August Meyer-Darcis (or Meyer Darcis) (12 September 1860 in Wohlen – 3 January 1913 in Florence) was a Swiss botanist and entomologist.

Georges Meyer-Darcis was the son of a world-famous straw goods manufacturer (Sogin & Meyer). From 1875 to 1878 he was educated in the Technical Department of the cantonal school in Aarau. Encouraged by Professor Mühlberg, he collected rare plants and insects with his friend Samuel Döbeli. After a commercial apprenticeship in Geneva, he managed the straw goods factory. In Geneva, he collected insects in his spare time, encouraged by the curator of the Entomological collections of the University of Geneva Dr. Emil Frey-Gessner (1826–1917).

In addition to his own collections, he purchased world Coleoptera and plant collections, including one by Johann Luzi Krättli (1812–1903), which he then presented to the Botanical Museum of the University of Zurich. Some parts of his beetle collection were sold to the French entomologist René Oberthür and are now preserved in the Muséum national d'Histoire naturelle, Paris.

References
Doebeli, S. 1914: [Meyer-Darcis, G.] Mitt. Schweiz. Ent. Ges., Bern 12[1910-1917] : 313-316.
Groll, E. K. (Hrsg.): Biografien der Entomologen der Welt : Datenbank. Version 4.15 : Senckenberg Deutsches Entomologisches Institut, 2010  Collection repository details (specimens held by museums).
Cambefort, Y. 2006. Des coléoptères, des collections et des hommes. Paris: Muséum national d'Histoire naturelle, collection « Archives ».

External links
Zurich Herbaria

Swiss entomologists
19th-century Swiss botanists
1913 deaths
1860 births
20th-century Swiss botanists